Nuria Torray (24 September 1934 - 7 June 2004) was a Spanish film, television and theatre actress.

Career

Television
Torray also made numerous appearances in television productions including the television series Un Mito Llamado....

Theatre
Additionally, she is known from her appearance in the stage play Mi Querida Familia.

Personal
Torray was married to the director Juan Guerrero Zamora, with whom she also worked, especially on television.

She died of colon cancer in Madrid, Spain in 2004.

Filmography

External links
 

1934 births
2004 deaths
Actresses from Barcelona
Spanish film actresses
Spanish stage actresses
Spanish television actresses
20th-century Spanish actresses
Deaths from cancer in Spain
Deaths from colorectal cancer